This is a chronological list of political systems in France, from Clovis to modern times. A series of different monarchies spanned 1300 years from the Early Middle Ages to the French Revolution in 1789. The Revolution was followed by five periods of republicanism alternating with periods of imperial monarchy and one bout with authoritarianism during the Second World War.

Introduction 

A political system, also known as a "form of government" is a way of organizing a state. Some different political systems are: democracy, totalitarianism, authoritarianism, theocracy, feudalism, monarchism, republicanism, and various hybrid systems. Each of these may be further subdivided, for example: absolute monarchy, constitutional monarchy, and feudal monarchy, all of which have been present in France. Many of these forms of government were known in Classical antiquity, and pre-date the existence of France.

Classical  usually regards Clovis I as the first king of France, however historians today consider that such a kingdom didn't begin until the establishment of West Francia in 843. For the purposes of this article, all political systems from Clovis on are considered to be in scope.

Historical context 

The Franks were a group of Romanized Germanic dynasties within the collapsing Western Roman Empire, who eventually commanded the region between the rivers Loire and Rhine. Clovis I established a single kingdom uniting the core Frankish territories, and was crowned King of the Franks in 496. He and his descendants ruled the Merovingian dynasty until 751, when it was replaced by the Carolingians (751-843). 
 

After the coronation of Charlemagne in 800, the Carolingian Empire (800–888) gradually came to be seen in the West as a continuation of the ancient Roman Empire. After the Treaty of Verdun in 843, the Kingdom of the Franks ("Francia") was divided into three separate kingdoms, merging into two: West Francia and East Francia. The latter became the Holy Roman Empire, and West Francia eventually became the core of the Kingdom of France, which was structured as a feudal monarchy and lasted for eight centuries (987–1792).

During the French Revolution, the last pre-revolutionary monarch, Louis XVI, was forced to accept the French Constitution of 1791, thus turning the absolute monarchy into a constitutional monarchy. This lasted a year, before the monarchy was abolished entirely in September 1792 and replaced by the First French Republic, marking the beginning of republicanism in France.

For roughly the next eighty years, there was an alternating series of empires, republics, and a kingdom, until the 1870 establishment of the Third Republic. From that point on, it was republics down to the present day, with the exception of the authoritarian Vichy regime during World War II. The Fifth Republic, established as a semi-presidential system in 1958, remains the political system in France as of 2022.

List

Timeline diagram

See also 

 Constitutional Cabinet of Louis XVI
 Constitutionalism
 Constitution of France
 Constitutions of France
 Family tree of French monarchs (simplified)
 France in the long nineteenth century
 French Community
 French Constitutional Council
 French law
 French Union
 Government of France
 Liste des gouvernements de la France (in French)
 List of forms of government
 List of French legislatures
 List of French monarchs
 Politics of France
 Carolingian dynasty 
 Clovis I 
 Francia
 Franks#Carolingian empire
 Franks#Merovingian kingdom
 House of Bourbon
 House of Orléans
 House of Valois
 List of Frankish kings
 List of French monarchs
 Merovingian dynasty
 Popular monarchy
 Robertians

Notes

References

Works cited

Further reading 

 

Constitutions of France
Constitutional referendums in France
Legal history of France
Political systems
Systems